Bairgania is a town and notified area in the Sitamarhi district in the state of Bihar, India. Bairgania is one of the blocks of Sitamarhi districts and is a border of India that links Nepal via Rautahat District through a custom checkpoint. Bairgania is the first town of India that is located on the bank of the Bagmati River.It has a good government medical hospital and experience doctors such as alumni from PMCH.

Administration 
Bairgania is a Nagar Parishad city in the district of Sitamarhi, Bihar.

The city of Bairgania is divided into 21 wards for which elections are held every 5 years.

Demographics
According to the 2011 Census of India, Bairgania has a population of 42,895, of which 22,789 are males and 20,106 are females. The population of children between the ages of 0-6 is 7,540, accounting for 17.58 percent of the total population of Bairgania (NP). In Bairgania, The sex ratio is 882 compared to the state average of 918. Moreover, the child sex ratio in Bairgania is approximately 865, compared to the Bihar state average of 935.

The literacy rate of the city of Bairgania is 65.72 percent, higher than the state average of 61.80 percent. Male literacy is around 73.41 percent, while female literacy is 57.04 percent.

Bairgania has total administration over 8,010 houses, to which it supplies basic amenities, like water and sewerage. It is also authorised to build roads within Nagar Panchayat limits and impose taxes on properties coming under its jurisdiction.

Transport

Rail 
Bairgania is situated on the Delhi – Gorakhpur - Bairgania - Sitamarhi - Darbhanga - Kolkata rail line.

Bairgania is connected to several cities in Bihar with daily passenger trains. There are multiple daily connections to Muzaffarpur, Darbhanga, Raxaul, and Sitamarhi, and daily connections to Patliputra, Hajipur, Samastipur, Sonpur, and Narkatiaganj.

Weekly express trains connect to Delhi with stops in major cities in Uttar Pradesh including Varanasi and Lucknow. Kolkata is also connected by weekly express trains; the train being 13044 Howrah Raxaul Express.

There are also direct trains to Lucknow and Varanasi with stops in several towns in Uttar Pradesh. Chhapra, Patna, Muzaffarpur, Jabalpur, Mumbai, Darbhanga, Barauni, Dhanbad, Bokaro, Ranchi, Rourkela, Bilaspur, Raipur, Nagpur, and Hyderabad are also connected by weekly or multiple weekly trains. Delhi is connected via Sadbhawna Express. Previously, all tracks were metre gauge but most have been converted to  broad gauge. The metre gauge track from Raxaul to Narkatiaganj was converted in August 2018. It is likely that this route will continue to be used by other trains.

Road 
Bairgania is served by buses and trains from Patna via Sitamarhi, Sheohar, and Motihari. In early 2019, a bus route was established between Bairgania to Delhi via Muzaffarpur.

Due to regular heavy rain and flooding, Bairagania-Dhang road conditions can be treacherous.

Airways 

Border crossing
There is a border crossing to Gaur, Nepal with a customs checkpoint. India and Nepal have an open border with no restrictions on movement of their nationals and no need for visa or passport documents for local people.  There is a customs checkpoint for goods and third-country nationals. There are jeeps, cars, tempos (three wheel vehicle), and tangas (horse-driven six-seater rickshaw) that travelers can take from Bairgania station to the Gaur bus park.

Education 
The city has primary, secondary, and high schools. The area also features colleges affiliated with Bhimrao Ambedkar University, Muzaffarpur. Students from the area generally move to bigger cities like Muzaffarpur, Darbhanga, Patna, Varanasi, and Delhi to pursue a college education. Many alumni from IIT, IIM, Banaras Hindu University, Delhi University, and Jawaharlal Nehru University come from this area. People from Bairgania have done well in the fields of civil services, state services, central banking, commercial banking, engineering, and IT, among others.

Religious places

Shri Buddhi Mata Mandir 
It is the most famous temple and is dedicated to the Goddess Buddhi. The Pilgrimate/Darshan of the Goddess during the festival of Rama Navami is the most celebrated and revered in the region. Devotees from Nepal and the adjoining areas in the thousands perform their darshan & worship during Rama Navami.

Shivalya Mandir 
This is an ancient temple of Lord Shiva made up by the king of Sheohar. The Navaratri of this temple is very famous .

Manohar Baba Mandir 
This is an ancient temple of Lord Radha Krishna.

Notable Landmarks 
For visitors from outside, the notable landmarks are High School, bairgania. Police Station, Bairgania. Sharma Bhawan, Lnt Watika, Ms Jewells etc.

Notes

References

Cities and towns in Sitamarhi district
Transit and customs posts along the India–Nepal border